The Melaka Gallery is a gallery about Malacca in Jakarta, Indonesia.

History 

The gallery was established by renovating an old building at Malaka Street. The street location was chosen due to its name resemblance. It was constructed with the cooperation with West Jakarta government. It was officiated by Jakarta Governor Joko Widodo and Malacca Chief Minister Mohd Ali Rustam on 22 February 2013. In November 2018, the gallery moved to the Kota Post Office building at Fatahillah Square.

Architecture 
The gallery is housed in a 90 m2 building.

Exhibition 
The gallery displays pictures and photos of Malacca and anything related to it, from the leaders, locations, tourist attractions, museums, zoos etc. It also features historical and cultural books about Malacca and some handicraft.

See also 
 List of colonial buildings and structures in Jakarta

References 

2013 establishments in Indonesia
Art museums and galleries in Indonesia
Tourist attractions in Indonesia
West Jakarta